Dendroaeschna is a monotypic genus of Australian dragonflies in the family Brachytronidae.
The only known species of this genus is Dendroaeschna conspersa,
commonly known as a wide-faced darner.

Dendroaeschna conspersa is a medium-sized, brown to black dragonfly with pale markings.
It is endemic to eastern Australia, where it inhabits lowland streams.

Gallery

Note about family
There are differing views as to the family that Dendroaeschna best belongs to:
 It is considered to be part of the Brachytronidae family at the Australian Faunal Directory
 It is considered to be part of the Aeshnidae family in the World Odonata List at the Slater Museum of Natural History
 It is considered to be part of the Telephlebiidae family in The Complete Field Guide to Dragonflies of Australia

See also
 List of Odonata species of Australia

References 

Anisoptera genera
Monotypic Odonata genera
Odonata of Australia
Endemic fauna of Australia
Taxa named by Robert John Tillyard
Insects described in 1916
Dragonflies